is the fifth studio album by Japanese pop band Pizzicato Five. It was released on September 1, 1991 by the Nippon Columbia imprint Seven Gods, serving as the band's first album for Nippon Columbia. This Year's Girl is the first Pizzicato Five album to feature Maki Nomiya as lead vocalist. On the album, the band augmented their Shibuya-kei sound with elements of alternative dance and began to more fully incorporate sampling into their music.

This Year's Girl was reissued by Readymade Records on September 30, 2000 and March 31, 2006.

Track listing

Charts

References

External links
 

1991 albums
Pizzicato Five albums
Nippon Columbia albums
Japanese-language albums